Morita Tsunetomo (Japanese:森田 恒友; 9 April 1881, Tamai, now part of Kumagaya - 8 April 1933, Tokyo) was a Japanese painter in the yōga style; known primarily for landscapes.

Life and work 
His teachers there were Koyama Shōtarō and Nakamura Fusetsu. Together with Ishii Hakutei and Yamamoto Kanae, he published an art journal called Hōsun (方寸; roughly: Dimensions). 

In 1914, he visited Paris and Brittany, where he came under the influence of modern French art; especially Paul Cézanne, before being compelled to return to Japan at the outbreak of World War I. In 1916, he joined the yōga department of Nihon Bijutsuin (visual arts academy). He was one of the founders of the artists' group, "Shunyōkai" (春陽会; roughly: Spring Association) in 1922. He became Director of the Western Painting Department at the new Imperial Art Academy (now Musashino Art University) in 1929. 

Until he was fifty-one, he devoted himself exclusively to landscapes. During his last two years, he did ink drawings in a modified nihonga style.

He also wrote under the pseudonym "Heiya" (平野; roughly: Open Field). His works include an anthology of essays (平野雑筆) and a book of art instruction (恒友画壇), both published in  1934. The following year,   published a book of Morita's art commentaries.

Sources 
 "Morita Tsunetomo". In: Hans Vollmer: Allgemeines Lexikon der bildenden Künstler des XX. Jahrhunderts. Vol.3: K–P. E. A. Seemann, Leipzig 1956, pg.424

External links 

 Works by Morita in the National Museum of Modern Art, Tokyo
 More works by Morita @ ArtNet
 Prints by Morita @ the Carnegie Museum of Art

1881 births
1933 deaths
Japanese painters
Yōga painters
People from Saitama Prefecture